Iktisad (İqtisad) is a rural locality (a village) in Utyakovsky Selsoviet, Gafuriysky District, Bashkortostan, Russia. The population was 7 as of 2010. There are 2 streets.

Geography 
Iktisad is located 28 km south of Krasnousolsky (the district's administrative centre) by road. Ishimovo is the nearest rural locality.

References 

Rural localities in Gafuriysky District